Houssay is a lunar impact crater located on the lunar far side near the northern pole. The crater is located to the northeast of and directly adjacent to crater Nansen. Houssay was adopted and named after the Argentinian physiologist Bernardo Houssay by the IAU in 2009.

References

External links
 LAC-1 area - Map of northern lunar pole

Impact craters on the Moon